The 2009–10 WICB President's Cup was the 36th edition of the Regional Super50, the domestic limited-overs cricket competition for the countries of the West Indies Cricket Board (WICB). The competition was played as a standalone tournament, with all matches held in Guyana.

Eight teams contested the competition – the six regular teams of West Indian domestic cricket (Barbados, Guyana, Jamaica, the Leeward Islands, Trinidad and Tobago, and the Windward Islands), and two development teams (Combined Campuses and Colleges and the West Indies under-19 side). The group stages were heavily impacted by rain – out of twelve matches in total, four were shortened, two ended in no result, and five were abandoned entirely. The final was played at Guyana National Stadium in Providence, with Trinidad and Tobago defeating Guyana by 81 runs to claim their tenth domestic one-day title (and second in a row). Guyana's Narsingh Deonarine led the tournament in runs, while his teammate Royston Crandon and Trinidad's Dwayne Bravo were the equal leading wicket-takers.

Squads

Group stage

Zone A

Zone B

Finals

Semi-finals

Final

Statistics

Most runs
The top five run scorers (total runs) are included in this table.

Source: CricketArchive

Most wickets

The top five wicket takers are listed in this table, listed by wickets taken and then by bowling average.

Source: CricketArchive

References

2009 in West Indian cricket
2009–10 West Indian cricket season
Regional Super50 seasons